The 2012 Geneva Open Challenger was a professional tennis tournament played on hard courts. It was the 25th edition of the tournament which was part of the 2012 ATP Challenger Tour. It took place in Geneva, Switzerland between October 29 and November 4, 2012.

Singles main-draw entrants

Seeds

 1 Rankings are as of October 22, 2012.

Other entrants
The following players received wildcards into the singles main draw:
  Stéphane Bohli
  Sandro Ehrat
  Henri Laaksonen
  Alexander Rumyantsev

The following players received entry from the qualifying draw:
  Adrien Bossel
  Grégoire Burquier
  Jonathan Eysseric
  Sergiy Stakhovsky

Champions

Singles

 Marc Gicquel def.  Matthias Bachinger, 3–6, 6–3, 6–4

Doubles

 Johan Brunström /  Raven Klaasen def.  Philipp Marx /  Florin Mergea, 7–6(7–2), 6–7(5–7), [10–5]

External links
Official Website

Geneva Open Challenger
Geneva Open Challenger